Todd Rundgren's Utopia is the debut album by the American rock band Utopia, released in October 1974 on Bearsville Records. The band was formed in 1973 by musician, songwriter, and producer Todd Rundgren who decided to expand his musical style by moving from pop-oriented rock towards progressive rock. He assembled a six-piece group that featured three keyboardists and toured as a live act. Most of the album was recorded in the studio except "Utopia", the opening track, which was recorded live in concert in 1974.

The album peaked at number 34 on the Billboard 200 and critical reaction towards it was mixed.

Background
Like Rundgren's solo albums  A Wizard, a True Star (1973) and Initiation (1975), the album pushed the limits of vinyl. At almost an hour in length, the sound needed to be compressed in order to fit it onto one record, resulting in a decline in audio quality. The CD version avoids this issue. On the first reissue of the album, released in 1978, the title of "Utopia" was changed to "Utopia Theme" and publishing credits were changed from Earmark Music to Earmark Music and Screen Gems - Columbia Music. This may have happened as a result of legal action against Rundgren by Tony Sales for appropriation of the song in 1976, for royalties of $100,000 or more.

"Utopia" was recorded live in concert at the Fox Theatre in Atlanta, Georgia on April 25, 1974. After a bootleg of the entire concert circulated amongst collectors for many years, the recording was officially released as Live at the Fox 1973 in 2015 by RockBeat Records. There has been confusion as to which date is correct, because the performance date was erroneously listed as November 8, 1973 on the original broadcast LP from the radio show Retrorock that aired in 1983 that features a reworked version of "Utopia". Previous performances from the 1973 tour have a marching band feel during the quiet sections that were reworked into a looser feel for the subsequent 1974 tour. The performance is also heavy on songs from the Todd album which were not performed until 1974.

Track listing
Note: "Utopia" is titled "Utopia Theme" on later editions.

Personnel
Utopia
 Todd Rundgren – vocals, electric guitar
 Mark "Moogy" Klingman – keyboards, Hammond B-3 organ
 Ralph Schuckett – keyboards
 Jean Yves "M. Frog" Labat – synthesizer
 John Siegler – bass guitar, cello
 Kevin Ellman – drums, percussion

Production
 Todd Rundgren – producer and engineer
 David Le Sage – assistant engineer
 Maruo Miyauchi – design and illustration at Push Pin Studios

References 

1974 debut albums
Todd Rundgren albums
Albums produced by Todd Rundgren
Utopia (band) albums
Bearsville Records albums
Rhino Records albums